Buraly (Buralı) is a rural locality (a village) in Iteyevsky Selsoviet, Ilishevsky District, Bashkortostan, Russia. The population was 235 as of 2010. There are 2 streets.

Geography 
Buraly is located 12 km northeast of Verkhneyarkeyevo (the district's administrative centre) by road. Iteyevo is the nearest rural locality.

References 

Rural localities in Ilishevsky District